Claviderma is a genus of molluscs belonging to the family Prochaetodermatidae.

The species of this genus are found on the coasts of Atlantic Ocean and Australia.

Species:

Claviderma amplum 
Claviderma australe 
Claviderma brevicaudatum 
Claviderma compactum 
Claviderma crassum 
Claviderma gagei 
Claviderma gladiatum 
Claviderma laticarinatum 
Claviderma mexicanum 
Claviderma tricosum 
Claviderma virium

References

Molluscs